Dylon Cormier (born September 23, 1992) is an American professional basketball player. Cormier usually plays as shooting guard. He played collegiate for Loyola of Maryland from 2011 to 2014.

Professional career
In September 2014, Cormier signed his first professional contract in the Netherlands with ZZ Leiden. Cormier won the DBL Sixth Man of the Year award in his rookie season.

During the 2016–17 season, Cormier played for the DMV Warriors of the ABA.

References

External links
Profile FIBA.com
Loyola Greyhounds bio

1992 births
Living people
American expatriate basketball people in the Netherlands
Basketball players from Baltimore
Dutch Basketball League players
Loyola Greyhounds men's basketball players
Shooting guards
B.S. Leiden players
American men's basketball players